Tandora may refer to:
 Tandora, Queensland, a locality in the Fraser Coast Region, Queensland, Australia
 Tandora County, a county in New South Wales, Australia